James Clemens may refer to:
 James Clemens (lord mayor), English merchant and shipowner, Lord Mayor of Liverpool, 1775–76
 James Clemens, pen name of author James Paul Czajkowski (born 1961), who also uses the pen name James Rollins
 James Clemens Jr. (1791–1878), American businessman
 James Brackenridge Clemens (1825–1867), American entomologist
 James T. Clemens (born 1943), American theoretical physicist

See also
 James and Sophia Clemens Farmstead, a farm in Darke County, Ohio
 James Clemens High School, a high school in Madison, Alabama